Howard Thayer Kingsbury Jr. (September 11, 1904 – October 27, 1991) was an American rower who competed in the 1924 Summer Olympics. He was born in New York City and died in Yarmouthport, Massachusetts. He was the father Nathaniel Wales Kingsbury (October 19, 1940 – November 9, 1998). In 1924, he was part of the American boat, which won the gold medal in the eights.

References

External links
 

1904 births
1991 deaths
Sportspeople from New York City
Rowers at the 1924 Summer Olympics
Olympic gold medalists for the United States in rowing
American male rowers
Medalists at the 1924 Summer Olympics